Iridium compounds are compounds containing the element iridium (Ir). Iridium forms compounds in oxidation states between −3 and +9, but the most common oxidation states are +1, +3, and +4. The highest oxidation state (+9), which is also the highest recorded for any element, is found in gaseous .

Oxides

Only one binary oxide is well-characterized: Iridium dioxide, . It is a blue-black solid. The compound adopts the TiO2 rutile structure, featuring six coordinate iridium and three coordinate oxygen. It adopts the fluorite structure.

Another oxide, iridium tetroxide, is also known, with iridium in the +8 oxiation state. At higher temperatures, the oxide is unstable. The detection of the iridium tetroxide cation  by infrared photodissociation spectroscopy with formal oxidation state +9 has been reported, the highest currently known of any element.

Halides

Binary trihalides,  are known for all of the halogens. For oxidation states +4 and above, only the tetrafluoride, pentafluoride and hexafluoride are known. Iridium hexafluoride, is a volatile yellow solid, composed of octahedral molecules. It decomposes in water and is reduced to ,. Iridium pentafluoride is also a strong oxidant, but it is a tetramer, formed by four corner-sharing octahedra.

Complexes

The coordination complexes of iridium are extensive.

Iridium in its complexes is always low-spin. Ir(III) and Ir(IV) generally form octahedral complexes. Polyhydride complexes are known for the +5 and +3 oxidation states.

Iridium also oxyanions with oxidation states +4 and +5.  and  can be prepared from the reaction of potassium oxide or potassium superoxide with iridium at high temperatures. Such solids are not soluble in conventional solvents.

As for many elements, the chlorides are key complexes. Hexachloroiridic(IV) acid, and its ammonium salt are the most common iridium compounds from an industrial and preparative perspectives. They are intermediates in the purification of iridium and used as precursors for most other iridium compounds, as well as in the preparation of anode coatings. The  ion has an intense dark brown color, and can be readily reduced to the lighter-colored  and vice versa. Iridium trichloride, which can be obtained in anhydrous form from direct oxidation of iridium powder by chlorine at 650 °C, or in hydrated form by dissolving  in hydrochloric acid, is often used as a starting material for the synthesis of other Ir(III) compounds. Another compound used as a starting material is ammonium hexachloroiridate(III), .

Oxyanions

Iridium forms oxyanions in the +4 oxidation state. It forms compounds such as lithium iridate (Li2IrO3), which forms black crystals with three slightly different layered atomic structures, α, β, and sometimes γ. Lithium iridate exhibits metal-like, temperature-independent electrical conductivity, and changes its magnetic ordering from paramagnetic to antiferromagnetic upon cooling to 15 K. Lithium iridate is a potential electrode material for the lithium-ion battery. This application is hindered by the high costs of Ir, as compared to the cheaper Li2MnO3 alternative.

Organoiridium chemistry 

Organoiridium compounds contain iridium–carbon bonds. Early studies identified the very stable tetrairidium dodecacarbonyl, . In this compound, each of the iridium atoms is bonded to the other three, forming a tetrahedral cluster. The discovery of Vaska's complex opened the door for oxidative addition reactions, a process fundamental to useful reactions. For example, Crabtree's catalyst, a homogeneous catalyst for hydrogenation reactions. Iridium is usually supplied commercially in the Ir(III) and Ir(IV) oxidation states. Important starting reagents being hydrated iridium trichloride and ammonium hexachloroiridate. These salts are reduced upon treatment with CO, hydrogen, and alkenes. Illustrative is the carbonylation of the trichloride:
IrCl3(H2O)x + 3 CO → [Ir(CO)2Cl2]− + CO2 + 2 H+ + Cl− + (x-1) H2O

Many organoiridium(III) compounds are generated from pentamethylcyclopentadienyl iridium dichloride dimer. Many of derivatives feature kinetically inert cyclometalated ligands. Related half-sandwich complexes were central in the development of C-H activation.

Iridium complexes played a pivotal role in the development of carbon–hydrogen bond activation (C–H activation), which promises to allow functionalization of hydrocarbons, which are traditionally regarded as unreactive.

See also
 Cobalt compounds
 Rhodium compounds

Notes

References

Iridium
 
Chemical compounds by element